The name Haim can be a first name or surname originating in the Hebrew language, or deriving from the Old German name Haimo.

Hebrew etymology
Chayyim (Classical Hebrew: ,), also transcribed Haim, Hayim, Chayim, or Chaim (English pronunciations:  ,), is a Hebrew name meaning "life". Its first usage can be traced to the Middle Ages. It is a popular name among Jewish people. The feminine form for this name is Chaya (Classical Hebrew: ,; English pronunciations:).

Chai is the Hebrew word for "alive". According to Kabbalah, the name Hayim helps the person to remain healthy, and people were known to add Hayim as their second name to improve their health.

In the United States, Chaim is a common spelling; however, since the phonemic pattern is unusual for English words, Hayim is often used as an alternative spelling. The "ch" spelling comes from transliteration of the Hebrew letter "chet", which also starts words like Chanukah, Channa, etc., which can also be spelled as Hanukah and Hannah. It is cognate to the Arabic word , with the same meaning, deriving from the same Proto-Semitic root.

Hebrew letters are also used as numerals, and the Hebrew letters that spell "chai" also stand for the number 18. Thus, 18 is considered a lucky number in Jewish culture. It is common to give gifts and contributions to charity in multiples of 18.

Among Argentine Jews, the Spanish name Jaime (a Spanish cognate of James) is often chosen for its phonetic similarity to Haim.

Hayim is a non-governmental organization that works on a voluntary basis to provide relief and support for pediatric oncology patients in Israel.

The names Vivian and Zoe have a similar meaning.

L'Chaim toast
L'Chaim in Hebrew is a toast meaning "to life". When a couple becomes engaged, they get together with friends and family to celebrate. Since they drink l'chaim ("to life"), the celebration is also called a l'chaim.

The origins of the custom to toast this way may be traced to an account described in the Talmud, where R. Akiva said upon pouring cups of wine poured at a banquet a benediction of "Wine and life to the mouth of the sages, wine and life to the mouth of the sages and their students." Many reasons for this custom have been offered. One reason based on the Zohar is to wish that the wine would be tied to the tree of life and not to the tree of death with which Eve had sinned. A second reason brought forward is that there was a common practice to make people who intend to kill drink wine and thereby be calmed, and therefore there is a custom to proclaim "to life!" over wine in the hope that it will prevent bloodshed. A third reason is that wine was created to comfort those who are in mourning (based on Proverbs 31:6) and there emerged a practice to toast thus when drinking in sad times in the hope that one day the drinker will drink wine in good happy times, and the practice of toasting this way subsequently extended to all situations.

Old German etymology

The earliest attested forms of this etymology occur in Old German, as Haimo. This Old German name was borrowed into Old French, including into the Anglo-Norman dialect spoken in England, in forms including Haim. This became one source of the English surname Haim, along with variants like Hame, Haim, Haime, Haimes, Hains, Haines, Hayns, Haynes, Hammon and Hammond.

In 1881, 3 people in Great Britain bore the surname Haim and 67 the surname Haime. Around 2011, the numbers stood at 94 and 173 respectively, with two bearers of the surname Haim in Ireland.

People with the given name Haim
Notable people with the name include:
 Haim Arlosoroff (1899–1933), Zionist politician
 Chaim ibn Attar (1696–1743), the Or Hachaim
 Haim Bar-Lev (1924–1994), Israeli military officer and government minister
 Haim Ben-Shahar, Israeli economist and  president of Tel Aviv University
 Hayim ben Bezalel (died 1588), German rabbi
 Chaim Bloom (born 1983), American chief baseball officer for the Boston Red Sox
 Chaim Buchbinder (born 1943), Israeli basketball player
 Chaim Deutsch, New York City Council member
 Chaim Elata, professor emeritus of mechanical engineering and president of Ben-Gurion University of the Negev, and chairman of the Israel Public Utility Authority for Electricity
 Hyam Greenbaum, founder of the BBC Television Orchestra
 Chaim (Harvey) Hames (born 1966), professor of history and rector at Ben-Gurion University of the Negev
 Haim Harari (born 1940), Israeli theoretical physicist; president of the Weizmann Institute of Science
 Haim Hazan (1937–1994), Israeli basketball player
 Chaim Herzog (1918–1997), Israeli president
 Chaim Koppelman (1920–2009), American printmaker
 Hyam Maccoby (1924–2004), British scholar
 Chaim Hezekiah Medini (1834–1904), the Sdei Chemed – Talmudic scholar and halachist
 Haim Palachi (or Palagi, 1788–1868), Torah scholar
 Hyam Plutzik (1911–1962), English poet and academic
 Chaim Potok (1929–2002), American Jewish author
 Haim Revivo (born 1972), Israeli former international footballer
 J. Hyam Rubinstein (born 1948), Australian mathematician
 Haim Saban (born 1944), Israeli-American media mogul
 Haym Salomon (1740–1785), primary financier of the American Revolution 
 Haim Starkman (born 1944), Israeli basketball player
 Chaim Leib Shmuelevitz (1902–1979), Mirrer Rosh HaYeshiva
 Chaim Topol (1935–2023), Israeli actor
 Hayyim Tyrer (died 1813), rabbi
 Chaim Weizmann (1874–1952), Israeli president
 Gene Simmons (born 1949 as Chaim Witz), Israeli-American co-founder of Kiss
 H. M. Wynant (born 1927 as Chaim Winant), American actor
 Chaim Zlotikman (born 1957), Israeli basketball player

People with the surname Haim
 Aaron ben Hayyim (fl. 1836), Russian exegete
 Aharon Ibn Hayyim (1545–1632), Biblical and Talmudic commentator
 Alana (born 1991), Danielle (born 1989) and Este Haim (born 1986), members of the American band Haim
 Corey Haim (1971–2010), Canadian actor
 David Bar-Hayim (born 1960), Israeli rabbi
 Emmanuelle Haïm (born 1962), French harpsichordist and conductor
 Karima Mathilda Haim or Mathilda May (born 1965), French actress
 Mordechai "Moti" Haim, former Israeli footballer, father of the band members of Haim
 Nahshon Even-Chaim or Phoenix (born 1971), Australian computer hacker
 Ofir Haim (born 1975), Israeli football player
 Paul Ben-Haim (1897–1984), Israeli composer
 Philippe Haïm (born 1967), French film director, writer and composer
 Salim Haim (1919–1983), Iraqi dermatologist
 Solayman Haïm (1887–1970), Iranian lexicographer, translator, playwright and essayist
 Werner Haim (born 1968), Austrian ski jumper
 Yehuda Ben-Haim (1955–2012), Israeli boxer
 Yehoyada Haim (born 1941), Israeli diplomat
 Yosef Hayyim (1832–1909), Sephardic Rabbi
 Ze'ev Ben-Haim (born 1907), Israeli linguist
 Zemah ben Hayyim (fl. 889–895), Gaon of Sura
 Zigi Ben-Haim (born 1945), American-Israeli sculptor and painter

See also
Higham (surname), includes people with the surname Hyam
Hyams
Hyman
L'Chaim Society, University of Oxford

References

Hebrew-language names
Jewish surnames
Jewish given names